A deputy commissioner is a police, income tax or administrative official in many countries. The rank is commonplace in police forces of Commonwealth countries, usually ranking below the Commissioner.

Australia
In all Australian police forces, deputy commissioner is the rank directly below that of commissioner and senior to the rank of assistant commissioner. In all forces, excepting the New South Wales Police Force where the insignia is crossed and wreathed tipstaves surmounted by a crown, the same insignia as that of a lieutenant-general in the army, the insignia is a diamond (or a star, in the case of the Victoria Police), the same as that of a major-general in the army.

Bangladesh
The Deputy Commissioner (popularly abbreviated to "DC") or District Magistrate is the executive head of the district, an administrative sub-unit of a division. The deputy commissioners are appointed by the government from a Deputy Secretary of BCS Administration Cadre. Deputy Commissioner of Taxes (popularly abbreviated as DCT) is an Income-tax authority. Deputy Commissioner of Taxes are basically officers of BCS Taxation Cadre. DCT includes Assistant Commissioner of Taxes as well.

Hong Kong
Hong Kong Police Force have two DCs, which are in charge of the Operational Department and Management Department respectively.

India 

The deputy commissioner or district magistrate is the executive head of a district, an administrative sub-unit of a state. The district magistrates are entrusted with overall responsibility for law and order, implementation of government schemes and are also authorised to hear revenue cases pertaining to the district.  A district magistrate is also authorised to collect Land Revenue and is therefore also referred as a collector (revenue) and also to control encroachment of government land in the district. In India officers of Indian Administrative Service cadre are appointed this office.

The Deputy commissioner of police (DCP) is a senior rank in the Indian Police Service.

Pakistan 

In Pakistan usually the Pakistan Administrative Service, formally known as District Management Group, cadre of the Central Superior Services or officers of Provincial Management Services erstwhile Provincial Civil Services are appointed to this office.

Papua New Guinea 
In the Royal Papua New Guinea Constabulary, there are three  Deputy Commissioners. They report to the Police Commissioner and are in charge of all Police Duties by directing their respective ACP's.
 Operations
 Administration
 Training, Reform and APEC

United Kingdom
The Deputy Commissioner of Police of the Metropolis is the deputy head of the London Metropolitan Police.

See also
 Deputy Commissioner of Police (Singapore)
 Police commissioner

References

Police ranks